Jonathan David Hoke (born January 24, 1957) is a former American football defensive back who played for the Chicago Bears in the National Football League (NFL). He played college football at Ball State University. He was also a member of the Kansas City Chiefs.

References 

1957 births
Living people
American football defensive backs
Ball State Cardinals football players
Chicago Bears players